On the night of September 19, 2008, a Learjet 60 business jet (registration  operating for Global Exec Aviation crashed during take-off from Columbia Metropolitan Airport in South Carolina.

Four of the six people on board died in the crash. The survivors, musician Travis Barker and disc jockey Adam "DJ AM" Goldstein, were critically injured. The jet had been due to fly Barker, Goldstein, and their entourage to Van Nuys, California, after their TRV$DJAM band's performance at a concert in Five Points.

Aircraft and crew 
The aircraft involved was a Learjet 60 that had first flown in 2006, receiving its airworthiness certificate on December 14. It was powered by two Pratt & Whitney PW305A turbofan engines and had 108.5 flight hours with 123 take off and landing cycles.

The captain was Sarah Lemmon, 31, of Anaheim Hills, California and the first officer was James Bland, 52, of Carlsbad, California. Both pilots had joined Global Exec Aviation the same year of the accident.

Captain Lemmon had 3,140 flight hours, but only 35 of them were on the Learjet 60, and just eight of them were as a captain of that aircraft. An instructor described her as having "excellent" crew resource management. However, she had received several notices of disapprovals during her training.

First Officer Bland had 8,200 flight hours with 300 of them on the Learjet 60. The director of Global Exec Aviation, who had flown with both crew members of the accident flight, described Bland as "not overly assertive."

Accident 
Just before midnight, the plane was heading down the runway for takeoff when the occupants heard a loud bang. According to the Federal Aviation Administration, air traffic controllers saw sparks emanating from the plane. After experiencing a tire failure and aborting the take-off, the co-pilot notified air traffic control to send out emergency equipment because the aircraft would be going off the end of the runway. Barker and Goldstein stated that the aircraft felt "out of control" and was swaying back and forth.

The aircraft overran the runway end, crashed through the airport boundary fence, crossed South Carolina Highway 302, and came to rest on an embankment, bursting into flames. It took firefighters more than an hour to get the fire under control.

Victims and survivors 
Both pilots were killed, as well as passengers Charles Monroe Still, Jr. and Chris Baker. The pilot and co-pilot died from smoke inhalation and burns minutes after the crash. Passengers Still, Jr. and Baker died upon impact.

Barker and Goldstein escaped the plane and told first responders four others were on board. Both had second and third degree burns and received skin grafts. Goldstein was asleep at the time of the crash and woke up to Barker screaming. Barker opened the door to the plane and slid down the plane's wing. Goldstein jumped out after him. Goldstein was on fire, but was able to put out the flames by rolling on the ground.

Barker stated that he was covered in jet fuel, and started running and ripping off his clothes. Eventually, he heard someone tell him to stop, drop and roll, which put out most of the fire on his body. Barker had burns on sixty-five percent of his body and was in the hospital for eleven weeks following the accident. He has post-traumatic stress disorder, and did not fly on a plane again until August 2021.

Investigation 
On the cockpit voice recorder (CVR) the pilot indicates she is reacting to the apparent sound of a tire burst and attempting a rejected takeoff. Pieces of a tire were found at the crash site. The plane did not carry a flight data recorder (FDR).

The National Transportation Safety Board's (NTSB) report attributed the accident to tire bursts during take-off and the captain's resulting decision to abort at high speed. Several tires were severely under-inflated and punctured during take-off. Pieces of the tires damaged the plane's hydraulic system, causing the plane's brakes to fail.

The captain therefore aborted the takeoff after V1, violating these operating procedures. The first officer can be heard saying the appropriate "go go go" on the CVR. A contributing factor was the engines giving full power, even though the pilots were applying reverse thrust. The reason for this was the aircraft's air/ground sensor was damaged by debris and caused the sensor to go to "air" mode. Investigators also found that the captain had limited experience in the Learjet 60 and that the company's tire pressure inspections were inadequate.

Global Exec Aviation estimated that the tire pressure had been checked three weeks before the crash, but investigators stated that the type of tires on the Learjet 60 at the time lose approximately two percent of their pressure per day and would need to be replaced after eight days if they were not properly maintained. Additionally, investigators noted a design flaw in the thrust reverser system which the NTSB believed may have contributed, increasing the severity of the crash.

Lawsuits 
Both survivors, as well as the estates of two of the deceased, sued for damages from parties including Learjet, tire manufacturer Goodyear, and, in at least Goldstein's case, against the estates of the dead pilots. Barker's case was settled out of court in December 2009 and the terms of the settlement are confidential. The estates of Still, Jr. and Baker also reached settlements. Global Exec Aviation and ITAS, Inc. also filed a lawsuit against Learjet and Bombardier, the manufacturers of the plane. The owner of the plane also sued the Columbia Metropolitan airport.

See also 

 TWA Flight 843, another high-speed aborted take-off
 Spantax Flight 995, another aircraft that aborted take-off after passing V1

References

External links
"NTSB: Tire blowout likely to blame" (Archive) thestate.com
"Dashboard video shows fiery wreckage of plane crash" (Archive) wistv.com
 "Four die in plane crash; rock star, DJ survive" latimes.com
 "Dramatic Video: Moments After Travis Barker's Plane Crash" etonline.com
NTSB investigation docket

Aviation accidents and incidents in the United States in 2008
Accidents and incidents involving the Learjet 45 family
History of Columbia, South Carolina
Lexington County, South Carolina
Disasters in South Carolina
Airliner accidents and incidents in South Carolina
2008 in South Carolina
September 2008 events in the United States